Suffragium (plural suffragia) was the practice of buying and selling provincial governorships in the later Roman Empire and the early Byzantine Empire. Suffragium was prohibited by Justinian I in 535 AD.

Literature 
 

Government of the Roman Empire
Government of the Byzantine Empire
Justinian I